Eric Ellis may refer to:

 Eric Ellis (journalist), Australian journalist
 Eric Ellis (politician) (born 1942), former Australian politician